Kaldfjorden is a fjord on the west coast of the island of Kvaløya in Tromsø Municipality in Troms og Finnmark county, Norway. The Norwegian County Road 862 highway runs along the southern shore of the fjord.

References

Fjords of Troms og Finnmark
Tromsø